Marionia kinoi is a species of sea slug, a dendronotid nudibranch, a marine gastropod mollusc in the family Tritoniidae.

Distribution
This species was described from a site two miles south of Punta Arenas, Gulf of California coastline east of La Paz, near La Riviera, Baja California Sur, Mexico, 16 m depth.

References

Tritoniidae
Gastropods described in 2013